The Roneat Dek is a Cambodian metallophone, comparable to the Roneat ek. It is an ancient instrument made of 21 blackened-iron bars. It may be used in the Pinpeat ensemble and Mahaori orchestra. It is believed to have originated from the Royal Courts before the Angkor period. This instrument is rarely covered with ornamentation on either the bars or the sound box. The roneat dek is analogous to the ranat ek lek of Thailand.

Etymology 
In the Khmer language, Roneat means xylophone where "dek" or correctly written and pronounced as "daek" mean metal or iron. So Roneat dek literally means metal xylophone. This name is probably derived from the fact that the Roneat Daek's note bars are made of iron or other metals.

History 
 The origin of Roneat Dek is similar to other Khmer Roneat genres and thought to predate the Angkorian period or in the earlier Angkorian period. 

According to Ouknha Moha Thipadei Meas Ni, the chief of Cambodian Royal Orchestra, this type of Roneat was modeled from Javanese gamelan musical instrument called Gendér since the reign of Khmer king Jayavarman II. At the end of 9th century he was in exile in Java. He then returned to Cambodia and became the first king of the Khmer Empire, bringing with him some Javanese influence. This type of Roneat genre is thought to have originated after this historical event; however, this Roneat genre had been modified distinctively from its original gendér form.

Structure 
The Roneat Dek or Roneat Thong has 21 iron or bronze bars. Because of their weight, the bars cannot be suspended on cords but are laid in stepwise order on pads over a rectangular trough resonator. In its shape and size, the bars resemble those of Roneat Ek, but they are tuned by scraping or firing away part of metal.

The player use a pair of mallets or Roneat sticks similar to those of other Roneats but made of hard material such as hide of a buffalo or elephant.

Variation

Roneat Thong
A variation on the instrument was the roneat thong which was made of a reddish-brown brass or bronze, similar to gold.

The Roneat dek and roneat thong may have been equivalent, with the gold-barred version played "in the Royal Palace," while the iron-barred version was used in the "Orchestra, picnic outside the palace, or in pagodas."

However, equivalent Thai metallaphone instruments can help illustrate possibilities; the Ranat ek lek had a golden and a blackened iron version. That version was also historically called "ranad thawng." Thai music also has a lower pitched instrument, the Ranat thum lek. If these instruments follow the pattern of the Thai instruments, then the roneat thung may be like the ranat ek lek with brass and blackened-iron versions, or it may be the Cambodian equivalent of the lower pitched ranat thum lek.

Pictures with these instrument names (and with equivalent numbers of tone bars) similar to the higher and lower pitched Thai instruments were illustrated in the Cambodian book "Cambodian National Music."

However, these Thai musical instruments originated more recently, in the reign of King Rama IV (1854-1868) in the 19th century.  The similarity in their name may attributed to the Thai annexation of Northwestern Cambodia from late 18th century and ended in 1907 as the age of this Khmer musical instrument was thought to be much older than this.

Significance
Normally, Roneat Thong is used in Khmer royal orchestra whereas Roneat Dek is usually used in the Pinpeat orchestra outside the Royal Palace or in pagodas.

External links
UNESCO document, Traditional Musical Instruments of Cambodia. PDF.

See also
Roneat ek
Roneat thung
Traditional Cambodian musical instruments
Music of Cambodia

Cambodian musical instruments
Keyboard percussion instruments